FK Mladost (Serbian Cyrillic: ФК Mлaдocт Гaцкo) is a football club from the town of Gacko, in Republika Srpska, Bosnia and Herzegovina. The club played in the Premier League of Bosnia and Herzegovina in the 2002-03 season. However, due to poor results FK Mladost was relegated to the First League of the Republika Srpska.

Players
For the list of current and former players with Wikipedia article, please see :Category:FK Mladost Gacko players.

For recent transfers, see List of Bosnian football transfers summer 2012.

Notable players

The following former Mladost Gacko players have senior national team appearances:

 Predrag Stefanović
 Nemanja Supić
 Almir Osmanagić
 Milorad Cimirot
 Slavoljub Bubanja
 Ilija Prodanović
 Željko Damjanović
 Novica Miković
 Petar Gušić
 Jovica Vico
 Krsto Perović
 Siniša Blagojević
 Igor Popović
 Velibor Vasiljević 
 Marko Vidaković
 Jovo Međedović
 Miroslav Medan
 Gojko Cimirot
 Miodrag Gardašević
 Nikola Andrić
 Predrag Stojanović
 Boris Koprivica
 Nebojša Domazetović
 Đoko Ilić
 Krsto Perović
 Miljan Karna
 Savo Andrić
 Krsto Denda
 Marko Vidaković
 Miljan Vico
 Duško Rašević
 Miroslav Prelo
 Veselin Klimović
 Srđan Andrić
 Dragan Goranović
 Velibor Radović
 Savo Milojević
 Dejan Drakul
 Rajko Ćeranić
 Slobodan Guzina
 Svetozar Kašiković
 Bojan Jovin
 Bojan Mrković
 Saša Šiljegović
 Rajko Komnenić
 Nikola Sušić
 Stevan Bjelogrlić
 Novak Sušić
 Saša Tepavčević
 Novica Berak
 Tihomir Tufegdžić
 Dejan Lozo
 Vladimir Marković
 Đorđe Salatić
 Milosav Dangubić
 Marko Drakul
 Nemanja Mulina
 Novica Mučibabić
 Aleksandar Mumalo
 Nikola Koprivica 
 Marko Toholj
 Slobodan Marković
 Čedomir Šuković
 Sreten Nikolić

External links
 Club at BiHsoccer.

Football clubs in Republika Srpska
Football clubs in Bosnia and Herzegovina
Association football clubs established in 1970
1970 establishments in Bosnia and Herzegovina